Mamadou Doucouré (born 21 May 1998) is a professional footballer who plays as a defender for Bundesliga club Borussia Mönchengladbach. Born in Senegal, Doucouré has represented France internationally at youth levels.

Club career
Doucouré joined Borussia Mönchengladbach from Paris Saint-Germain in 2016. Having failed to make an appearance due to numerous injuries over his first four seasons at the club, he finally made his professional debut for Mönchengladbach in the Bundesliga on 31 May 2020. He came on as a 90th minute substitute for Florian Neuhaus in the home match against Union Berlin, which finished as a 4–1 win.

Personal life
Doucouré was born in Dakar, Senegal.

References

External links
 
 
 
 
 
 

1998 births
Living people
Footballers from Dakar
French footballers
Senegalese footballers
France youth international footballers
Senegalese emigrants to France
French expatriate footballers
French expatriate sportspeople in Germany
Senegalese expatriate footballers
French sportspeople of Senegalese descent
Senegalese expatriate sportspeople in Germany
Expatriate footballers in Germany
Association football defenders
Paris FC players
Paris Saint-Germain F.C. players
Borussia Mönchengladbach players
Borussia Mönchengladbach II players
Championnat National 2 players
Bundesliga players
Regionalliga players